Latin Holiday is an Australian television series that aired during 1961 on ABC. A variety series, each episode was set in a different country. Sergio Fochi was the host.

It was broadcast live in Melbourne, and kinescoped for showing on ABC stations. In Melbourne it was preceded on the schedule by U.S. documentary series The 20th Century and followed by U.K. series Daniel Farson Reports.

References

External links
Latin Holiday on IMDb

1961 Australian television series debuts
1961 Australian television series endings
English-language television shows
Black-and-white Australian television shows
Australian live television series
Australian variety television shows
Australian Broadcasting Corporation original programming